Laurie Pryor (born 1956/57) is an American politician serving in the Minnesota House of Representatives since 2017. A member of the Minnesota Democratic–Farmer–Labor Party (DFL), Pryor represents District 48A in the western Twin Cities metropolitan area, which includes the cities of Eden Prairie and Minnetonka and parts of Hennepin County, Minnesota.

Early life, education, and career
Pryor graduated from Austin High School in Austin, Minnesota. She attended Carleton College, graduating with a Bachelor of Arts in English. She later attended the University of Minnesota, graduating with a Master of Arts in speech communications.

Pryor was a management analyst for the Minnesota Department of Administration, a business consultant, a coordinator of volunteer programs for Vail Place, a program coordinator for Hopkins Community Education, and worked on Yvonne Selcer's campaign for the Minnesota House.

Minnesota House of Representatives
Pryor was first elected to the Minnesota House of Representatives in 2016, after the retirement of DFL incumbent Yvonne Selcer, and has been reelected every two years since. Pryor serves as chair of the Education Policy Committee, and sits on the Education Finance and Human Services Finance Committee.

Electoral history

Personal life
Pryor and her husband, Jon, have resided in Minnetonka, Minnesota since 1989. They have three children.

References

External links

 Official House of Representatives website
 Official campaign website

1950s births
Living people
People from Minnetonka, Minnesota
Carleton College alumni
University of Minnesota alumni
Democratic Party members of the Minnesota House of Representatives
21st-century American politicians
21st-century American women politicians
Women state legislators in Minnesota